Valley Transit refers to one of two transit companies in the United States:

 Valley Transit (Washington) in Walla Walla, Washington
 Valley Transit (Wisconsin) in Appleton, Wisconsin

See also
 Valley Metro
 Santa Clara Valley Transportation Authority
 Valley Regional Transit
 Valley Transit Company